The Apostolic Nunciature to the Republic of Brazil is an ecclesiastical office of the Catholic Church in Brazil. It is a diplomatic post of the Holy See, whose representative is called the Apostolic Nuncio with the rank of an ambassador.

Apostolic Nuncios to Brazil

Pietro Ostini (17 July 1829 –  2 September 1832)
Gaetano Bedini (28 October 1845 – 16 August 1847)
Vincentius Massoni (1856 – 1857)
Mariano Falcinelli Antoniacci, O.S.B. (30 March 1858 – 14 August 1863)
Angelo Di Pietro  (30 September 1879 – 21 March 1882)
Mario Mocenni  (28 March 1882 – 18 October 1882)
Vincenzo Vannutelli  (22 December 1882 –  4 October 1883)
Girolamo Maria Gotti, O.C.D. (19 April 1892 – 1 December 1896)
José Macchi (14 February 1898 –  January 1904)
Giulio Tonti (23 August 1902 – 4 October 1906)
Alessandro Bavona (10 April 1908 – 1911)
Giuseppe Aversa (2 March 1911 – 4 December 1916)
Angelo Giacinto Scapardini, O.P. (4 December 1916 – 1920)
Enrico Gasparri  (1 September 1920 – 1925)
Benedetto Aloisi Masella  (26 April 1927 – 1946)
Carlo Chiarlo (19 March 1946 – 24 September 1954)
Armando Lombardi (24 September 1954 – 4 May 1964)
Sebastiano Baggio (26 May 1964 – 23 June 1969)
Umberto Mozzoni (19 April 1969 – 1973)
Carmine Rocco (22 May 1973 – 12 May 1982)
Carlo Furno (21 August 1982 – 15 April 1992)
Alfio Rapisarda (2 June 1992 – 12 October 2002)
Lorenzo Baldisseri (12 November 2002 – 11 January 2012)
Giovanni d'Aniello (10 February 2012 – 1 June 2020)
 Giambattista Diquattro (29 August 2020 – present)

See also
Foreign relations of the Holy See
List of diplomatic missions of the Holy See
List of diplomatic missions in Brazil

References

External links
Apostolic Nunciature of Brazil page at gcatholic.org

Brazil
 
Holy See
Brazil–Holy See relations

it:Chiesa cattolica in Brasile#Nunziatura apostolica